S-TADIL J, or Satellite TADIL J, is a real-time Beyond Line-of-Sight (BLOS) Tactical Digital Information Link (TADIL) supporting the exchange of the same J Series message set that is implemented on Link-16 via the Joint Tactical Information Distribution System (JTIDS). S-TADIL J provides for robust continuous connectivity between Navy ships that are beyond JTIDS line-of-sight (LOS) transmission range. S-TADIL J is designed to  support and significantly improve long-range TADIL connectivity between widely dispersed fleet operational forces. With the deployment of S-TADIL J, operational units will  have three possible data link paths that can be used to support multi-ship data link-coordinated operations. S-TADIL J supports the same levels of surveillance and weapon coordination data exchange provided by Link-11 and Link-16. The TADIL J message standard is implemented on S-TADIL J to provide for the same level of information content as Link-16.

Change of terminology 
In the US, the term Tactical Digital Information Link (TADIL) is obsolete (per DISA guidance) and is now more commonly known as Tactical Data Link (TDL).

See also 
Tactical Data Links (TDLs)
Standard Interface for Multiple Platform Evaluation (SIMPLE), allows (Beyond Line of Sight) transmission of M-Series and J-Series messages over IP-based protocols.
 Joint Range Extension Applications Protocol (JREAP), allows transmission of M-Series and J-Series messages over long-distance networks.

External links 
 Federation of American Scientists article: Tactical Digital Information Links (TADIL)

Military radio systems
Military equipment of NATO
Military communications